The list of Florida hurricanes from 1900 to 1949 encompasses 108 Atlantic tropical cyclones that affected the U.S. state of Florida. Collectively, tropical cyclones in Florida during the time period resulted in about $4 billion (2008 USD) in damage. Additionally, tropical cyclones in Florida were directly responsible for about 3,550 fatalities during the time period, most of which from the 1928 Okeechobee Hurricane. The 1947 season was the year with the most tropical cyclones affecting the state, with a total of 6 systems. The 1905, 1908, 1913, 1927, 1931, 1942, and 1943 seasons were the only years during the time period in which a storm did not affect the Floridan coasts.

The strongest hurricane to hit the state during the time period was the 1935 Labor Day hurricane, which also bears the distinction of being the strongest recorded hurricane to strike the United States. Several other major hurricanes struck the state during the time period, including the 1926 Miami hurricane, the 1928 Okeechobee hurricane, and a cyclone each in 1945, 1947, 1948, and 1949. All of these storms made landfall as Category 4 hurricanes.

1900–1909

 September 5, 1900 – The Great Galveston hurricane passes over or just to the west of the western Florida Keys as a tropical storm, producing tropical storm force winds throughout the state. Prior warning keeps nearly all ships in the state at port, and no damage is reported.
 October 12, 1900 – A tropical storm hits near Cedar Key, crosses the state, and exits near Jacksonville.
 June 13, 1901 – The first storm of the season hits just east of Apalachicola.
 August 10, 1901 – A tropical storm moves ashore near Fort Lauderdale.
 September 17, 1901 – Pensacola is struck by a tropical storm which produces heavy rainfall along its path.
 September 28, 1901 – A tropical storm makes landfall near Apalachicola, though its effects, if any, are unknown.
 June 14, 1902 – The first storm of the season hits near Tallahassee, with no severe impact reported.
 October 10, 1902 – Pensacola is struck by a tropical storm; its impact is unknown.
 September 11, 1903 – A hurricane moves ashore near Fort Lauderdale, and after emerging into the Gulf of Mexico it hits near Panama City. Moderate damage to structures and crops is reported across the state, with monetary damage totaling about $650,000 (1903 USD, $15.5 million 2008 USD), and nine lives are lost when a British schooner capsizes near Delray Beach.
 October 17, 1904 – Light structural damage and locally heavy crop losses result from a hurricane hitting south of Miami before executing a counter-clockwise loop and striking again near Chokoloskee. Offshore, seven lives are lost after a schooner founders.
 November 3, 1904 – The fifth storm of the season made landfall as a tropical storm near Pensacola.
 June 12, 1906 – A tropical storm moves ashore near Panama City; no severe impact is reported.
 June 17, 1906 – A hurricane produces locally strong winds as it crosses the extreme southeastern portion of the state.
 September 27, 1906 – Southern Mississippi is struck by a moderate hurricane, with strong winds and waves affecting much of the Florida west coast. It is considered among the worst cyclones on record at Pensacola, where high tides cause severe shipping damage. The hurricane results in 32 casualties and $3.4 million in damage (1906 USD, $81 million 2008 USD).

 October 18, 1906 – The 1906 Florida Keys hurricane moves through the Florida Keys before crossing the extreme southeastern portion of the state. High seas destroy hundreds of vessels in the region, including many houseboats of the hundreds of workers on the Florida East Coast Railway construction through the Keys; a total of 135 workers are killed. On the mainland, the cyclone results in severe crop damage and the destruction of many houses in the Miami area, and across the state the hurricane causes 141 fatalities and over $360,000 in damage (1906 USD, $8.6 million 2008 USD). The storm tracked northward and ultimately made a second landfall as a tropical storm near Jacksonville.
 June 28, 1907 – The first storm of the season moves ashore near Panama City, with no severe impact reported.
 September 18, 1907 – A tropical depression crosses the southern portion of the state; no damage or fatalities are reported.
 September 28, 1907 – Strong winds and heavy rainfall occurs in association with a tropical storm striking the Florida Panhandle.
 June 28, 1909 – Fort Lauderdale is struck by a tropical storm, which produces light winds and otherwise little impact.
 August 29, 1909 – A weak tropical storm crosses the eastern portion of the state, resulting in minor impact.
 September 20, 1909 – The western Florida Panhandle receives minor damage, mostly to shipping, from a hurricane hitting southern Louisiana.
 September 25, 1909 – A tropical depression crosses the southern portion of the state, with no severe impact reported.
 October 11, 1909 – The 1909 Florida Keys hurricane strikes Marathon as major hurricane and brushes the rest of the island chain, destroying about 400 buildings and 300 boats; damage is estimated at $1 million (1909 USD, $24 million 2008 USD). Thirteen fatalities are reported throughout the state.

1910–1919
 October 17, 1910 – The Florida Keys are brushed by a major hurricane, which strikes the mainland near Fort Myers as a strong Category 2 hurricane a day later. High tides and heavy rainfall causes flooding in the keys, though damage is fairly minor. On the mainland, the hurricane destroys 10% of the state's citrus crop, and causes moderate damage elsewhere. Across the state, the hurricane results in around $360,000 (1910 USD, $8.3 million 2008 USD) and eleven fatalities.
 August 4, 1911 – A tropical depression develops near the Alabama/Florida border, and produces light rainfall and winds across the northern portion of the state.
 August 11, 1911 – Pensacola experiences  winds and 4.48 inches (114 mm) of precipitation in association with a hurricane hitting southern Alabama; damage is fairly minor.
 August 28, 1911 – A hurricane makes landfall on extreme southern South Carolina, with its large circulation producing moderate precipitation in northeastern Florida.
 November 1, 1911 – Shortly after becoming an extratropical cyclone, a tropical storm hits near Cedar Key and causes unsettled conditions across the state for several days.
 June 13, 1912 – The first storm of the season hits southern Louisiana, which produces about 3 inches (75 mm) of rainfall in Pensacola.
 September 10, 1912 – A tropical depression forms in the Gulf of Mexico and later moves ashore in extreme southeastern Mississippi; the developing disturbance produces heavy rainfall, including 23.2 inches (588 mm) at Cedar Key, and while making landfall it causes minor shipping and coastal damage in Pensacola.
 September 17, 1914 – The only tropical storm of the season strikes near the Georgia/Florida border, producing moderate rainfall and above normal tides.
 August 1, 1915 – A minimal hurricane hits near Daytona Beach, dropping moderate precipitation and causing some damage.
 September 4, 1915 – Apalachicola is struck by a hurricane that causes above normal tides and locally moderate damage.
 September 29, 1915 – A hurricane produces above normal tides in Pensacola.
 May 14, 1916 – A minimal tropical storm crosses the state.
 July 5, 1916 – High tides and about $1 million (1916 USD, $20 million 2008 USD) in the Pensacola area are caused by a hurricane making landfall on southern Mississippi.
 August 24, 1916 – A tropical storm moves across the southeastern portion of the state.
 September 13, 1916 – A low-pressure area moves ashore near Cape Canaveral, with the worst of its effects remaining offshore. Originally, it was classified as a tropical storm.
Despite the intensity, overall damage is small due to its fast track. The hurricane causes one drowning in Pensacola.
 November 15, 1916 – The remnants of a tropical storm brush the Florida Keys, but fails to produce significant damage in the state.
 June 22, 1918 – A tropical depression crosses the southern portion of the state.
 July 4, 1919 – The first storm of the season hits just west of Pensacola, with no severe impact reported.
 September 9, 1919 – The 1919 Florida Keys hurricane passes about 50 miles (80 km) south of Key West, producing strong winds and heavy rainfall reaching an estimated peak of 13.4 inches (340 mm). Shipping losses are heavy, and damage in the Florida Keys is estimated at $2 million (1919 USD, $25 million 2008 USD).
 September 30, 1919 – Moving ashore along the Georgia coastline, a tropical storm brushes northeastern Florida.

1920–1929

 September 22, 1920 – A hurricane strikes southern Louisiana, with its outer rainbands producing trace precipitation and gale-force winds in the western Florida Panhandle.
 September 30, 1920 – The final storm of season makes landfall near Cedar Key, bringing rainfall and gusty winds along much of the western coast. It causes coastal flooding and crop damage, and in St. Petersburg the storm results in an indirect fatality.
 October 25, 1921 – The 1921 Tampa Bay hurricane strikes Tarpon Springs, producing moderate winds, a storm tide reaching 10.5 feet (3.2 m), and heavy rainfall peaking at 11.73 inches (298 mm) at St. Leo. About five people are killed as a result of the storm, and damage is estimated at $5 million (1921 USD, $60 million 2008 USD).
 October 17, 1922 – A weak tropical storm moves ashore just west of the Florida/Alabama; there were no reports of serious damage.
 October 16, 1923 – Winds reach  at Pensacola in association with a hurricane hitting Louisiana, which causes shipping damage in northwestern Florida.
 October 17, 1923 – A tropical storm makes landfall on southern Mississippi, with winds reaching  in Pensacola.
 September 15, 1924 – A minimal hurricane moves ashore near Panama City, producing winds of up to  but little damage.
 October 21, 1924 – Moderate crop and flooding damage occurs after a hurricane strikes the southwestern portion of the state.
 December 1, 1925 – Moving ashore south of Tampa later than any other United States tropical cyclone on record, a tropical storm crosses the central portion of the state, dropping 14.1 inches (357 mm) of rain at Miami and heavily eroding northeastern beaches; damage is estimated at $3 million (1925 USD, $40.8 million 2016 USD). The storm kills 16 people in the state.
 July 27, 1926 – A moderate hurricane moves ashore near Cocoa Beach, killing one person and causing about $3 million in damage (1926 USD, $36.5 million 2008 USD), primarily from fruit losses.
 September 17, 1926 – The Florida Keys are brushed by a slow-moving and weak tropical storm.
 September 18, 1926 – The 1926 Miami hurricane makes landfall as a Category 4 hurricane near Miami. A powerful storm surge in excess of 11 feet (3.3 m) floods Miami Beach, while strong winds recorded at up to  cause severe damage across the region. About 4,725 houses are destroyed with another 9,100 damaged, leaving about 25,000 people homeless, and damage in the Miami area is estimated at $76 million (1926 USD, $926 million 2008 USD). Due to uncertainties, such as the inclusion of non-white fatalities, the National Weather Service reports the death toll in the state at 372 casualties, with a note that the total could be several dozen greater. Damage is heavy in Pensacola from the final landfall of the hurricane.
 October 21, 1926 – Passing a short distance east of the Florida Keys, a hurricane causes light damage and power outages near the coastline; one person is killed after being struck by flying debris.

 August 7, 1928 – The first hurricane of the season moves ashore near Fort Pierce, causing moderate damage to highways, crops, and telephone lines; damage is estimated at $5 million (1928 USD, $63 million 2008 USD), and there were four reported casualties near Jupiter.
 August 14, 1928 – A tropical storm strikes near Apalachicola after crossing the Florida Keys, causing minor damage.
 September 17, 1928 – The 1928 Okeechobee hurricane makes landfall between Jupiter and Boca Raton as the equivalent of a Category 4 hurricane, producing a storm surge of 10 feet and waves of up to 20 feet which causes severe damage near the coast. As it crosses the state, strongly northerly winds pile up water from Lake Okeechobee at its southern end, which surpasses the levee and floods a 450 mi2 (1165 km2) area up to 12 feet (3.6 m) deep. The flooding, which lasts for several weeks, causes severe loss of human and animal life; damage in the state is estimated at $25 million (1928 USD, $315 million 2008 USD). The death toll is unknown, but is estimated at over 2,500 fatalities, making the cyclone the third deadliest hurricane in American history.
 September 28, 1929 – A major hurricane crosses the southern portion of the state, and two days later hits near Apalachicola. The cyclone produces several tornadoes in the Miami area, and despite its ferocity overall damage is minor; three people are killed in association with the storm.

1930–1939
 August 9, 1930 – The second tropical storm of the season crosses through the center of the state; as it previously crossed the mountainous terrain of the Greater Antilles, the storm is severely weakened, and causes no reported serious damage in the state.
 August 30, 1932 – A tropical storm crosses the southern portion of the state, causing some minor structural damage and minor power outages.
 September 15, 1932 – A weak tropical storm produces light winds but no reported damage after hitting near Steinhatchee.
 July 30, 1933 – Moving ashore near Hobe Sound, a minimal hurricane causes minor damage to crops, roofs, and signs.
 August 20, 1933 – The remnants of the seventh tropical storm of the season hit near Tallahassee, resulting in minor damage.
 September 1, 1933 – Passing to the south of Key West, a moderate hurricane produces light winds and minor damage in the Florida Keys.
 September 4, 1933 – A Category 3 hurricane strikes Jupiter, with its strong winds destroying 4 million boxes of citrus fruit. The passage of the hurricane results in $2 million in damage (1933 USD, $33 million 2008 USD) and two deaths.
 October 5, 1933 – Paralleling the Florida Keys before accelerating northeastward, a major hurricane drops heavy rainfall and spawns a tornado in Miami, resulting in minor damage and two injuries.
 July 22, 1934 – Moving southwestward into the northeastern portion of the state, a tropical depression produces gusty winds across the northern portion of the state.
 October 6, 1934 – The eleventh tropical storm of the season hits near Pensacola, and causes no marked damage along its path.

A pressure of 892 mbar (26.35 inHg) is recorded at landfall, which at the time is the lowest reported pressure in the Western Hemisphere. A small but violent cyclone, the hurricane results in almost complete destruction over a distance of about 30 miles (48 km), much of it caused from its powerful storm surge. One estimate by the Red Cross indicates 409 fatalities in the Florida Keys, many of whom at war veteran work relief camps. It later hits near Cedar Key as a major hurricane, where it causes further damage and flooding.
 September 28, 1935 – Passing a short distance of Miami, a major hurricane produces moderate winds, but there is little damage along the coast.
The late-season storm results in a monetary damage total of $5.5 million (1935 USD, $87 million 2008 USD) across the southern portion of the state, much of it from roof damage. 5 deaths are reported in the state, with an additional 115 injuries.
 June 15, 1936 – The first storm of the season hits about 20 miles (32 km) south of Fort Myers, and while crossing the state drops up to 15 inches (380 mm) of precipitation. The passage of the storm results in some flooding damage, as well as three indirect deaths from a plane crash.
 July 29, 1936 – After moving across the southern portion of the state, a moderate hurricane moves ashore near Pensacola, causing fairly minor damage, largely limited to its second landfall. Four fatalities are indirectly related to the hurricane when a boat capsized in the Gulf of Mexico.
 August 21, 1936 – A weak tropical storm makes landfall near Daytona Beach; it produces heavy rainfall but results in minimal damage.
 July 30, 1937 – The first storm of the season hits near Clearwater, dropping moderate precipitation which reaches 8.88 inches (225 mm) near its landfall location; minor damage is reported.
 August 30, 1937 – Daytona Beach is struck by a tropical storm, and across the state it causes considerable minor damage. On the Florida Panhandle, its accompanying rainfall destroys several bridges.
 September 21, 1937 – A weak tropical storm hits near the mouth of the Steinhatchee River, which results in minor damage and a few injuries from its accompanying heavy rainfall.
 September 17, 1938 – The 1938 New England hurricane is initially—but erroneously—forecast to strike Florida, with storm warnings issued from Jacksonville through Key West.
 June 16, 1939 – The first storm of the season hits near Mobile, Alabama, with its outer rainbands dropping heavy rainfall across Florida and killing one child in Wauchula.
 August 11, 1939 – A minimal hurricane hits Fort Pierce and later on the Panhandle near Apalachicola. The storm causes minor damage, limited to uprooted trees and power outages, and kills one after rough waves capsized a boat at Cedar Key.
 September 26, 1939 –  wind gusts and no damage are reported in occurrence with a weak tropical storm hitting Louisiana.

1940–1949
 August 2, 1940 – Light winds are reported in association with a tropical storm moving across the northern portion of the state; no damage is reported.
 October 6, 1941 – A hurricane hits near Miami with gusts reaching  and later moves ashore along the Florida Panhandle. Its accompanying 4.1 foot (1.25 m) storm surge causes coastal flooding in the southeast portion of the state. The hurricane drowns five people in Carrabelle, and damage across the state totals about $675,000 (1941 USD, $9.9 million 2008 USD).
 October 20, 1941 – The final storm of the season moves ashore near Cedar Key after previously passing through the Florida Keys. It drops heavy rainfall which causes some flooding damage.
 September 10, 1944 – A tropical storm hits southeastern Louisiana, with the eastern portion of its circulation causing slight crop damage and gale-force winds across the western Florida Panhandle.
 October 19, 1944 – The final hurricane of the season strikes near Sarasota with winds of 105 mph (165 km/h). Its winds severely damage the citrus crop, which accounts for about 80% of the damage total of $63 million (1944 USD, $772 million 2008 USD) in the state. A total of 18 people are killed in the state.
 June 24, 1945 – An early-season hurricane moves inland between Brooksville and Dunnellon, and spawns one tornado near Melbourne. No lives are lost, which is credited due to the evacuation of thousands from the coast. Damage in the state is minor.
 September 4, 1945 – A weak tropical storm brushes the western coastline before turning to the northwest, and causes minor damage to boats in Miami.
 September 15, 1945 – The ninth storm of the season, a Category 4 hurricane, strikes Key Largo with wind gusts reaching . The winds ignite a fire at three hangars at the Richmond Naval Air Station, which destroys 25 blimps, 366 planes, and 150 automobiles. Across the state, the passage of the hurricane results in 1,632 destroyed houses, with an additional 5,372 damaged. Damage amounts to $54 million (1945 USD, $647 million 2008 USD), of which nearly half occurs at the Richmond Air Station. Four people are killed in the state, with an additional 43 injured.
 October 8, 1946 – Rapidly weakening from peak, the fifth storm of the season hits the Tampa Bay area as a minimal hurricane, this makes this the last hurricane to directly hit the Tampa Bay area to date. The hurricane causes moderate crop damage in the western portion of the state, with its storm surge resulting in additional coastal damage. Monetary damage across the state totals about $5.2 million (1946 USD, $57.5 million 2008 USD).
 November 1, 1946 – The last storm of the season moves ashore near Palm Beach as a minimal tropical storm; inland, it drops heavy rainfall which causes millions of dollars in crop damage.

 August 18, 1947 – Winds gusts reach  along the Florida Keys in association with a developing tropical storm.
 September 8, 1947 – A weak tropical storm moves ashore in Mississippi, with its outer rainbands producing winds of 51 mph at Pensacola.
 September 17, 1947 – The 1947 Fort Lauderdale hurricane strikes the southeastern portion of the state with wind gusts of at least ; sustained winds of over  occur along 70 miles (120 km) of the eastern coastline. The hurricane produces heavy rainfall, which causes damaging flooding along crop fields. Heavy damage is also reported from Fort Myers to Sarasota, and statewide damage from the hurricane totals about $31 million (1947 USD, $300 million 2008 USD). The hurricane causes 11 direct fatalities in the state, and is indirectly responsible for six more.
 September 23, 1947 – The sixth storm of the season hits near Yankeetown, dropping moderate rainfall which causes further flooding across the southern portion of the state. Nine tornadoes are spawned by the storm, which collectively destroy three houses and damage dozens of houses.
 October 7, 1947 – A tropical storm hits near the Florida/Georgia border, and after turning southwestward into the Gulf of Mexico loops to the northeast through the Florida Panhandle. The storm causes high tides and beach erosion along the eastern coastline.
 October 12, 1947 – A hurricane moves across the southern portion of the state and drops up to 13 inches (330 mm) of rainfall; the rainfall causes further flooding damage which ends an unusually wet season in the state. Wind damage is minor.
 July 9, 1948 – The second storm of the season hits near Destin. Some low-lying areas are flooded from heavy rainfall, but damage is minor.
 September 4, 1948 – A hurricane moves ashore along southern Louisiana, with its high tides extending eastward and reaching 3.4 feet at Pensacola. Damage is minor along the Florida Panhandle.
It drops moderate to heavy rainfall across the southern portion of the state, peaking at 11 inches (280 mm) in Miami, and causes considerable flooding. Across the state, the hurricane severely damages 1,161 homes and destroys 39 others, with damage totaling $12 million (1948 USD, $107 million 2008 USD). Three people are killed, with another 45 hospitalized.
The storm spawns 3 tornadoes, one of which destroys 25 houses in Pompano Beach. 678 homes are destroyed or severely damaged, and damage across the state totals $5.5 million (1948 USD, $49 million 2008 USD). The hurricane injures 42, though no deaths are reported in the state.
The winds severely damage crops across its path, with the avocado and grapefruit crops sustaining heavy losses. Many houses along its path are damaged, as well, and monetary damage in the state totals $45 million (1949 USD, $408 million 2008 USD). Additionally, four people are killed in the state, though it is unknown if all are directly related to the hurricane.

Monthly statistics

Deadly storms
The following is a list of hurricanes with known deaths in the state.

See also

References

Florida 1900
 1900
Florida 1900
Hurricanes